Yegor Dmitriyevich Pigayev (born 8 June 2002) is a Russian football player. He plays as a centre-back for SKA-Khabarovsk.

Club career
He made his debut for the main team of FC Nizhny Novgorod on 22 September 2021 in a Russian Cup game against FC Dynamo Barnaul.

Career statistics

References

External links
 
 
 

2002 births
Living people
Russian footballers
Association football defenders
FC Nizhny Novgorod (2015) players
FC SKA-Khabarovsk players